Tellina carpenteri, the carpenter tellin, is a bivalve mollusc in the family Tellinidae, the tellins. Synonyms include Tellina arenica (Hertlein and Strong, 1949), Tellina variegata (Carpenter, 1864) and Tellina (Moerella) carpenteri (Dall).

References

Tellinidae
Molluscs described in 1900